Hagonoy is the name of two places in the Philippines:

Hagonoy, Bulacan
Hagonoy, Davao del Sur

It is also the Filipino common name of a plant:

Chromolaena odorata, the common floss flower